The 2017 British Academy Television Awards were held on 14 May 2017 at the Royal Festival Hall in London. They were hosted by Sue Perkins.

The nominations were announced on 11 April, with The Crown nominated for five awards. The BAFTA Fellowship was awarded to Joanna Lumley.

The 2017 British Academy Television Craft Awards were held on 23 April 2017.

Winners and nominees

Programmes with multiple nominations

In Memoriam

Andrew Sachs
Mary Tyler Moore
Gareth Gwenlan
Jean Alexander
Darcus Howe
Brian Rix
Peter Vaughan
Antony Jay
Carla Lane
Gorden Kaye
Robert Vaughn
Jimmy Perry
Peter Morley
Tim Pigott-Smith
Steve Hewlett
Ian McCaskill
Michael Nicholson
Barry Hanson
Colin Dexter
Michael Wearing
Christopher Morahan
Christopher Bland
Philip Saville
Alan Simpson
Liz Smith
Caroline Aherne

References

External links
Official Site

2017 awards in the United Kingdom
2017 in British television
British Academy Television Awards
May 2017 events in the United Kingdom
Royal Festival Hall
2017 television awards